The PSO Tri-Nation Tournament was a One Day International cricket tournament hosted by Kenya in 2002. The hosts were joined by Australia and Pakistan for the Round-robin tournament where each team played one another twice. The tournament acted as good preparation for the teams as the continent would be hosting the World Cup half a dozen months later.

After topping the group, the unbeaten Australians took on Pakistan in the final. The Pakistanis batted first and posted 227 but with Australia at 1 for 67 in their chase the rain intervened and the game was declared a 'no result'. The tournament was thus shared between Australia and Pakistan. Man of the series went to one man from each team, Matthew Hayden, Misbah-ul-Haq and Martin Suji.

Points table

Group matches

1st match

2nd match

3rd match

4th match

5th match

6th match

Final

References

External links
Tournament home at Cricinfo

2002 in cricket
International cricket competitions in 2002
Kenyan cricket seasons from 2000–01
Sport in Nairobi
International cricket competitions in Kenya
2002 in Kenyan cricket